The twenty-ninth season of the animated television series The Simpsons premiered on Fox in the United States on October 1, 2017, and ended on May 20, 2018. On November 4, 2016, The Simpsons was renewed for seasons 29 and 30. This season marked the show's surpassing Gunsmoke as the longest-running scripted series in primetime television by number of episodes, with the series' 636th episode "Forgive and Regret".

Episodes

Production

Development 
During February 2018, episodes of The Simpsons were held back to avoid competing with the 60th Annual Grammy Awards, Super Bowl LII, the 2018 Winter Olympics, and the 90th Academy Awards. This resulted in a nine-week gap in between new episodes, and is the second season to not have any new episodes airing in February, after the twenty-fifth season (which also aired in a Winter Olympics year).

Casting 
The season features guest appearances from Norman Lear, Martin Short,  Ray Liotta and Nikolaj Coster-Waldau. In addition, Bill Plympton animated a sixth couch gag in "3 Scenes Plus a Tag from a Marriage", having previously done so in season 23's "Beware My Cheating Bart", season 24's "Black Eyed, Please", season 25's "Married to the Blob", season 27's "Lisa the Veterinarian", and season 28's "22 for 30". This season  also features Kelsey Grammer reprising his role as Sideshow Bob and Homer seeking help from Shaquille O'Neal in "Gone Boy", and a song written by guest star Rachel Bloom in "Springfield Splendor". In addition, the premiere episode of the season "The Serfsons" is the final time to date that Apu Nahasapeemapetilon is voiced by series cast member Hank Azaria.

Music 
On August 30, 2017, it was announced that longtime Simpsons score composer Alf Clausen was let go from the series. The series switched from a live orchestrated score to a produced score by Bleeding Fingers Music. Hans Zimmer (who composed  the score for The Simpsons Movie) and Russel Emanuel are score producers, with Steve Kofsky executive producing. Clausen's last episode was "Whistler's Father".

References

Simpsons season 29
2017 American television seasons
2018 American television seasons